Wild Horse Mesa is a 1947 American Western film directed by Wallace Grissell and starring Tim Holt, Nan Leslie, and Richard Martin. It was written by Norman Houston, based on the novel of the same name by Zane Grey.

It was the eighth and last of a series of Zane Grey novels filmed by RKO. The book had been previously filmed in 1925 (starring Holt's father) and 1933.

Plot
Two cowboys go to work for a rancher and his beautiful daughter. Together they search for wild horses. When they find the horses, a rival rancher offers to purchase them, but during the transaction he murders the good rancher. The rival rancher is soon killed by one of his own men, and he in turn is killed by the wild horse who is the leader of the herd.

Cast

Production
The film was shot at RKO's backlot in Encino and at Lone Pine.

References

External list
 
 
 
Review of film at Variety

1947 films
1947 Western (genre) films
Films based on works by Zane Grey
American Western (genre) films
RKO Pictures films
American black-and-white films
1940s American films